Blepephaeus luteofasciatus is a species of beetle in the family Cerambycidae. It was described by Gressitt in 1941. It is known from Thailand.

References

Blepephaeus
Beetles described in 1941